The Sikorsky XSS was an American two-seat amphibious flying boat built by Sikorsky Aircraft for evaluation by the United States Navy in 1933, for carrier-borne and/or catapult-launched scouting duties.

Design and development
The XSS-1 was powered by a  Pratt & Whitney R-1340D Wasp engine in a strut-mounted pod above the center-section of the high-mounted gull-wing, forward of the cockpit which was aft of the wing.

See also

References

Citations

Bibliography

 

1930s United States military reconnaissance aircraft
S1S
Flying boats
Single-engined tractor aircraft
High-wing aircraft
Gull-wing aircraft
Aircraft first flown in 1933